The 2017 NASCAR PEAK Mexico Series was the tenth season of the NASCAR PEAK Mexico Series and the thirteenth season organized by NASCAR Mexico. The series returned after one-year hiatus. It was the first season with PEAK as the series' title sponsor. It began with the Difrenosa 120 at Autódromo Monterrey on March 26 and concluded with the Gran Premio FedEx at Autódromo Hermanos Rodríguez on November 12. Rubén García Jr. entered the season as the defending Drivers' Champion. Abraham Calderón won his second career championship.

In 2017, was created the NASCAR FedEx Challenge Series and NASCAR Mikel's Truck Series as supporting series of NASCAR PEAK Mexico Series.

Drivers

Schedule

Results and Standings

Races

Drivers' championship

(key) Bold – Pole position awarded by time. Italics – Pole position set by final practice results or Owners' points. * – Most laps led.

Notes
 They receive championship points in supporter series.
2 – Mike Sánchez received championship points, despite the fact that he did not start the race.
3 – Elliot Van Rankin substituted for Carlos Peralta and the 29 points he scored with fifteenth place went towards Carlos Peralta.
4 – Ineligible for points.

See also

2017 Monster Energy NASCAR Cup Series
2017 NASCAR Xfinity Series
2017 NASCAR Camping World Truck Series
2017 NASCAR K&N Pro Series East
2017 NASCAR K&N Pro Series West
2017 NASCAR Whelen Modified Tour
2017 NASCAR Pinty's Series
2017 NASCAR Whelen Euro Series

References

NASCAR PEAK Mexico Series

NASCAR Mexico Series